Princess Jeongmyeong (27 June 1603 – 8 September 1685) was a Joseon Royal Princess as the tenth daughter of King Seonjo, from Queen Inmok. During her older half-brother's reign, she suffered hardships, and her title was revoked, but later it was reinstated after her half-nephew ascended the throne. Due to this, her life was believed to have been as brittle and unfortunate like her ancestor and her descendant who were famous for their unfortunate fates as the Princess of Joseon and Korean Empire.

Biography

Early life
Princess Jeongmyeong was born on 27 June 1603 as the only daughter of Seonjo of Joseon and Queen Inmok. At this time, her father was already 52 years old, and her mother was 19 years old. The age gap had made it seem like Princess Jeongmyeong was Seonjo's granddaughter but despite the age difference, he favoured and showed affection towards Jeongmyeong, she becoming his favourite daughter.

However, her father died on 16 March 1608 at 55 years old when she was 6 years old and when her younger brother was 3 years old.

Gwanghaegun's rise to the throne and Confinement 
Afrer her father's death, her older half-brother, Crown Prince Gwanghae took over the throne, both of her maternal grandfather, Kim Je-Nam and her younger brother, Grand Prince Yeongchang were involved in Gyechuk Oksa (계축옥사), and were to be executed for contempt and plotting against the king.

Her grandfather was executed in 1613. Followed by her younger brother, Grand Prince Yeongchang who died from poisoning at 9 years old in 1614. This was because Gwanghaegun had seen the young prince as a threat to this position as a king. She and her mother were then incarcerated and imprisoned at the West Palace (서궁).

As a child, she liked to write and when she was confined in the West Palace, she wrote letters that resembled her parents' handwriting, specifically her father's, to comfort her beloved mother, this writing was then known as Hwajeong (화정, 華政). But when she was about 30–40 years old, she stopped writing calligraphy and Chinese characters.

It was said that when she was 11 years old, she contacted Smallpox disease. Based on The Diary of Gyechuk (계축일기),  Buk-in (북인, 北人), Gwanghae's supporters seemed very happy and pleased about this news. At this time, there was a superstition that smallpox was not curable, but it was enough to deliberately send meat that was not cut into pieces nearby. Since a Princess couldn't succeed the throne, it was assumed that her mother and her younger brother actually wanted smallpox to die rather than wishing for her to die.

When the Seo-in faction (서인, 西人) had made sure they couldn't leave the palace, the Princess's mother, Queen Inmok feared that her daughter would be taken away and lied that the Princess had already died. During this time, in 1618, she was 16 years old. In 1623, 5 years later, Gwanghae was deposed from his position and was succeeded by Prince Neungyang (능양군).

Marriage
After the deposition of Gwanghaegun, there was a talk within court officials on having her mother, who became Queen Dowager (대비, 大妃), be demoted and just become a royal consort (후궁, 後宮) so that the Princess will just be an Ong-ju (옹주, 翁主), a princess of second rank. Yi Yi-Cheom (이이첨) forced the Princess to get married and live outside the palace so that her marriage will just be that of an Ong-ju (옹주, 翁主). However, the Princess's mother, who had lost and parted with her son during this period, didn't want to lose and part again with her only daughter, so she immediately applied to her stepson, Gwanghaegun of Joseon to free her daughter.

Later, in 1623, when her half nephew, Injo of Joseon succeeded Gwanghae's throne, she was reinstated and allowed to live in Changdeok Palace (창덕궁, 昌德宮) along with her mother. At this time, she was 21 years old. Which was a difficult age to marry because during this time period, the Princess was considered too old to marry as girls usually married at a young age. As she couldn't find a husband who was similar to her age, she decided to choose someone younger than her. Since the other Princesses  already married a long time ago, it had made it seem that she married the latest among the Joseon Princesses at the time. But in fact, her half-sisters and her half-nieces got married at an older age than her, so the court ordered her to marry in hurry. The reason why her marriage was postponed was unknown but it seemed because of the circumstances along this period, or maybe because the Princess's mother who feared that if she was married, she wouldn't be able to live in the palace and live peacefully within her in-law's house.

Then, on 26 September 1623, there was a selection (간택; Gantaek) to be her husband and there were only 9 chosen. The winner of this selection was Hong Ju-Won (홍주원), the son of Hong Yeong (홍영) from the Pungsan Hong clan (풍산 홍씨), but at that time, Hong Ju-won, who was younger than her, was 18 years old. It was also said that Hong Ju-won already had a fiancée, and had to break off the engagement to marry the Princess.

Meanwhile, in the process, the Princess's mother, now Queen Dowager Soseong, made a problem with even down Hong Ju-Won to the horse that only the King could ride. At this, Injo, who is the new King of Joseon, was in disagreement, but he could not blame nor punish the Dowager Queen because he still respected her and regarded her as his parent. After the marriage, Injo gave Ingyeong Palace (인경궁) to her as her manor with Hong, and also gave her Jeong-cheol (정철). However, feared of suspicion of artificiality, she deliberately turned away from politics and only concentrated on sewing and housework.

Originally, Gyeongguk Daejeon (경국대전) stipulated that the princess's house couldn't exceed 50 periods, but her house was 200 years old until now. In Gyeongsang Province, she enjoyed tremendous luxury, such as being given a large land reaching 8,076 units. Now, this land whom was given to the Princess is the notorious pitfall of tenancy disputes until the Japanese colonial era.

She later bore Hong Ju-Won 7 sons and 1 daughter. Which, through her second eldest son, Hong Man-Yong; her great-great-great-granddaughter, Lady Hyegyeong, eventually married her step great-great-great-great-grandnephew, Crown Prince Sado. Crown Prince Sado is the grandson of her step great-great-grandnephew, King Sukjong.

Her third eldest son, Hong Man-Hyeong, married Queen Inhyeon's paternal aunt, and eventually became the great-great-great-grandparents of Royal Noble Consort Won of the Pungsan Hong clan; who was the concubine of her step great-great-great-great-great-grandson, King Jeongjo.

After Queen Inmok's death
After her mother's death, there were some suspicions of King Injo and King Hyojong due to the letters that were found in the palace in the Queen Dowager's living quarters. Then, Princess Jeongmyeong, and the court ladies who accompanied and involved, were arrested one after one and in a row, suffered not only several sentences and torture, but also death sentences. Even after getting torture and several sentences, she received the best treatment as an adult from her families during the King Hyeonjong and King Sukjong's reign.

Later life
The Princess outlived her husband by 13 years, living from her father, King Seonjo's reign, until her step great-great-grandnephew, King Sukjong's reign. She later died on 8 September 1685 at 82 years old. After her death, she was buried near her husband's tomb. She was the Princess who had lived the longest among all of Joseon Princesses in Joseon history records.

Family
Father: King Seonjo of Joseon (조선 선조) (26 November 1552 – 16 March 1608)
Grandfather: Grand Internal Prince Deokheung (덕흥대원군) (2 April 1530 – 14 June 1559)
Grandmother: Grand Internal Princess Consort Hadong of the Hadong Jeong clan (하동부대부인 정씨) (23 September 1522 – 24 June 1567)
Mother: Queen Inmok of the Yeonan Kim clan (인목왕후 김씨) (15 September 1584 – 16 August 1632)
Grandfather: Kim Je-nam, Internal Prince Yeonheung (연흥부원군 김제남) (1562 – 1 June 1613)
Grandmother: Internal Princess Consort Gwangsan of the Gwangju No clan (광산부부인 광주 노씨) (1557–1637)
 Sibling
Younger brother: Yi Ui, Grand Prince Yeongchang (영창대군 이의; 12 April 1606 – 19 April 1614) 
Adoptive nephew: Yi Pil, Prince Changseong (창성군 이필; 1627–1689)
Husband: Hong Ju-won, Prince Consort Yeongan (영안위 홍주원) (1606 – 3 November 1672)
Father-in-law: Hong Yeong (홍영) (1584–1645)
Mother-in-law: Lady Yi of the Yeonan Yi clan (연안 이씨) (? – 1656)
Issue(s):
 Son: Hong Tae-mang (홍태망, 洪台望) (1625 – ?)
 Son: Minister of Rites Hong Man-yong, Duke Jeonggan (예조판서 정간공 홍만용, 禮曹判書 貞簡公 洪萬容) (1631 – 1692)
 Daughter-in-law: Lady Song of the Yeosan Song clan (여산 송씨)
 Grandson: Hong Jong-gi (홍중기, 洪重箕)
 Granddaughter-in-law: Lady Yi of the Jeonju Yi clan (전주 이씨, 全州 李氏)
 Great-grandson: Hong Seok-bo (홍석보, 洪錫輔) (1672 – 1729)
 Great-grandson: Hong Hyeon-bo (홍현보, 洪鉉輔)
 Grandson: Hong Jong-beom (홍중범, 洪重範)
 Great-grandson: Hong Jeong-bo (홍정보, 洪鼎輔)
 Great-grandson: Hong Jin-bo (홍진보, 洪晉輔)
 Grandson: Hong Jong-yeon (홍중연, 洪重衍)
 Granddaughter-in-law: Lady Kim of the Cheongpung Kim clan (청풍 김씨)
 Grandson: Hong Jong-bok (홍중복, 洪重福)
 Great-grandson: Hong Gyeong-bo (홍경보, 洪鏡輔)
 Grandson: Hong Jong-ju (홍중주, 洪重疇)
 Granddaughter: Hong Hui-im, (홍희임, 洪喜妊), Lady Hong of the Pungsan Hong clan (풍산 홍씨, 豊山 洪氏)
 Granddaughter: Hong Dan-im (홍단임, 洪端妊), Lady Hong of the Pungsan Hong clan (풍산 홍씨, 豊山 洪氏)
 Granddaughter: Hong Myo-im (홍묘임, 洪妙妊), Lady Hong of the Pungsan Hong clan (풍산 홍씨, 豊山 洪氏)
 Son: Hong Man-hyeong (홍만형, 洪萬衡) (1633 – 1670)
 Daughter-in-law: Lady Min of the Yeoheung Min clan (여흥 민씨)
 Grandson: Hong Jong-mo (홍중모, 洪重模)
 Great-grandson: Hong Yun-bo (홍윤보, 洪允輔)
 Great-grandson: Hong Geun-bo (홍근보, 洪謹輔)
 Grandson: Hong Jong-hae (홍중해, 洪重楷)
 Great-grandson: Hong Yang-bo (홍양보, 洪良輔)
 Son: Hong Man-hui (홍만희, 洪萬熙) (1635 – 1670)
 Daughter-in-law: Lady Hwang of the Changwon Hwang clan (창원 황씨)
 Son: Hong Tae-ryang (홍태량, 洪台亮) (1637 – ?); died young
 Son: Hong Tae-yuk (홍태육, 洪台六) (1639 – ?); died young
 Daughter: Hong Tae-im (홍태임, 洪台妊), Lady Hong of the Pungsan Hong clan (풍산 홍씨, 豊山 洪氏) (1641 – ?)
 Son-in-law: Jo Jeon-ju (조전주, 曺殿周) (1640 – 1696) from the Changnyeong Jo clan (창녕 조씨)
 Son: Hong Man-hoe (홍만회, 洪萬恢) (1643 – 1709)
 Daughter-in-law: Lady Hong of the Namyang Hong clan (남양 홍씨)
 Grandson: Hong Jong-seong (홍중성, 洪重聖)

Descendants

This list is just a notable figure, such as: 
Hong Seok-Bo (홍석보), who served as a Cham-pan (참판) during King Sukjong's reign was her great-grandson (3rd generation descendant).
Yi In-Geom (이인검), who served as a Su-chan (수찬) was her maternal great-grandson (3rd generation descendant).
Hong Hyeon-Bo (홍현보), who was the grandfather of Lady Hyegyeong was her great-great-grandson (4th generation descendant).
Hong Sang-Han (홍상한), who married with Queen Seonui's 4th cousin, Lady Eo (어씨) was her great-great-grandson (5th generation descendant).
Hong Bong-Han (홍봉한), who was the father of Lady Hyegyeong, was her great-great-grandson (5th generation descendant).
Crown Princess Consort Hyegyeong (혜경왕세자빈), who was the primary wife of Yeongjo of Joseon's second son, Crown Prince Sado was her great-great-great-granddaughter (6th generation descendant).
Royal Noble Consort Won (원빈 홍씨), who was the wife and consort of Jeongjo of Joseon, was her 4th great-granddaughter (7th generation descendant).
Hong Hyeon-Ju, Duke Hyogan, Prince Consort Yeongmyeong (홍현주 효간공 영명위), who was the husband of Jeongjo of Joseon and Royal Noble Consort Su of the Bannam Park clan's daughter, Princess Sukseon, was her 4th great-grandson (7th generation descendant).
Queen Shinjeong, who was the great-great-granddaughter of Hong Hyeon-bo, and the wife of Crown Prince Hyomyeong; the grandson of King Jeongjo, was the her 5th great-granddaughter (8th generation descendant).

In popular culture

Drama and Television series
Portrayed by Park Rusia in the 1995 KBS2 TV series West Palace.
Portrayed by Han Min in the 2014 tvN TV series The Three Musketeers.
Portrayed by Heo Jung-eun, Jung Chan-bi, and Lee Yeon-hee in the 2015 MBC TV series Splendid Politics.

Novel
Portrayed in the Naver Novel Series The Novel of Princess Jeongmyeong (소설 정명공주).

Webtoon
Portrayed in the 2019 KakaoPage Webtoon series Finally, The Blue Flame (마침내 푸른 불꽃이).

References

Cites

Books

1603 births
1685 deaths
Princesses of Joseon
17th-century Korean people
17th-century Korean women